These are the results of the women's 4 x 400 metres relay event at the 1995 World Championships in Athletics in Gothenburg, Sweden.

Medalists

* Runners who participated in the heats only and received medals.

Results

Heats
Qualification: First 3 of each heat (Q) plus the 2 fastest times (q) advance to the final.

Final

References
 Results
 IAAF

- Women's 4x400 Metres Relay
Relays at the World Athletics Championships
1995 in women's athletics